The Mandarin rat snake (Euprepiophis mandarinus) is a species of nonvenomous colubrid snake endemic to Asia. It is closely related to Euprepiophis conspicillata, the Japanese forest rat snake. Mandarin rat snakes are one of the most popular rat snakes found in the pet trade.

Description

Distribution
India (Arunachal Pradesh), Myanmar, Laos, Vietnam, Taiwan, China (Anhui, Beijing, Chongqing, Fujian, Gansu, Guangdong, Guangxi, Guizhou, Hainan, Hebei, Henan, Hubei, Hunan, Jiangsu, Jiangxi, Liaoning, Shaanxi, Shanghai, Shanxi, Sichuan, Tianjin, Tibet, Yunnan, Zhejiang)

Type locality: China: Chekiang, Chusan island (modern transliteration: Zhejiang, Zhoushan) (Cantor, 1842).

Taxonomy
In recent years there has been some taxonomic controversy over the genera of rat snakes.  Based on mitochondrial DNA, Utiger et al. (2002) argued for a splintering of the genus Elaphe and suggested a reworking of the genera.

Natural history
The Mandarin rat snake is a secretive species, often using rodent burrows for shelter.  It feeds primarily on small rodents,  prefers cooler temperatures, and is predominantly crepuscular.  It occurs from sea level to at least .

References

Further reading
Boulenger, G. A. 1894. Catalogue of the Snakes in the British Museum (Natural History). Volume II., Containing the Conclusion of the Colubridæ Aglyphæ. London: Trustees of the British Museum (Natural History). (Taylor and Francis, printers.) xi + 382 pp. + Plates I.- XX. (Coluber mandarinus, pp. 42–43.)
Cantor, T. 1842. General Features of Chusan, with remarks on the Flora and Fauna of that Island. Ann. Mag. Nat. Hist. [Series 1] 9: 265-278, 361-370, 481-493. (Coluber mandarinus, p. 483.)
 Gumprecht, A. 2002. Elaphe mandarina (Cantor). Sauria (Suppl.) 24 (3): 565-568.
 Gumprecht, A. 2003. Anmerkungen zu den Chinesischen Kletternattern der Gattung Elaphe (sensu lato) Fitzinger 1833. Reptilia (Münster) 8 (6): 37-41.
 Lenk, P.; Joger, U. & Wink, M. 2001. Phylogenetic relationships among European ratsnakes of the genus Elaphe Fitzinger based on mitochondrial DNA sequence comparisons. Amphibia-Reptilia 22 (3): 329-339.
 Purser, P.A. 2003. Elaphe mandarinus. Reptilia (GB) (31): 30-33.
 Schulz, K.D. 1996. Eine Monographie der Schlangengattung Elaphe Fitzinger. Bushmaster, Berg (CH): 1-460.
 Schulz, Klaus-Dieter 1996. A monograph of the colubrid snakes of the genus Elaphe Fitzinger. Koeltz Scientific Books, 439 pp.
Smith, M.A. 1943. The Fauna of British India, Ceylon and Burma, Including the Whole of the Indo-Chinese Sub-region. Reptilia and Amphibia. Vol. III.—Serpentes. London: Secretary of State for India. (Taylor and Francis, printers.) xii + 583 pp. (Elaphe mandarina, pp. 157–158.)

External links
 The Ratsnake Foundation
 Google Images

Colubrids
Snakes of Asia
Snakes of China
Reptiles of India
Reptiles of Laos
Reptiles of Myanmar
Reptiles of Taiwan
Snakes of Vietnam
Reptiles described in 1842
Taxa named by Theodore Edward Cantor